Sir Francis Lewis Castle Floud KCB KCSI KCMG (18 May 1875 – 17 April 1965) was a British civil servant and diplomat. Very unusually, he received three knighthoods for his public services.

Francis Floud came from a clerical family. He was educated at Cranleigh School and King's College London, having refused to go to Oxford University because he did not wish to enter the church; his younger brother went in his stead. He entered the Board of Agriculture at a junior level in 1894 and, while working there, qualified as a barrister of Lincoln's Inn.

He served in a variety of posts before being appointed, in 1920, the Permanent Secretary of the Ministry of Agriculture and Fisheries. He was Chairman of the Board of Customs and Excise from 1927 to 1930 and then Permanent Secretary of the Ministry of Labour (1930-1934) during the very difficult period following the financial crisis, when unemployment and other benefits were cut by the National government. He served as British High Commissioner to Canada from 1934 to 1938. and was invested as a Knight Commander of the Order of St Michael and St George (KCMG) in the 1938 New Year Honours.

From 1938 to 1940 he chaired the Bengal Land Revenue Commission, for which he was appointed a Knight Commander to the Order of the Star of India (KCSI) in the 1941 New Year Honours and, in his retirement, a number of other public bodies.

Francis Floud married, in 1909, Phyllis, daughter of Colonel Everard A. Ford. They had two sons, Peter Floud and Bernard Floud MP and a daughter Phyllis, who married Peter du Sautoy.

External links 

 The Papers of Sir Francis Floud held at Churchill Archives Centre

References

1875 births
1965 deaths
Place of birth missing
Place of death missing
People educated at Cranleigh School
Alumni of King's College London
Members of Lincoln's Inn
High Commissioners of the United Kingdom to Canada
Knights Commander of the Order of the Star of India
Knights Commander of the Order of the Bath
Knights Commander of the Order of St Michael and St George